Håvard Klemetsen (born 5 January 1979) is a Norwegian former Nordic combined skier who has competed since 2002, representing Kautokeino I.L. He debuted in the World Cup in 2003. He has four 4 x 5 km team medals at the FIS Nordic World Ski Championships with a gold in 2005 and bronze in 2007 and twice in 2011. Klemetsen also finished 20th in the 15 km individual event at the 2005 championships.

Klemetsen finished 20th in the 15 km individual at the 2006 Winter Olympics in Turin. His best individual career finish was second in a 7.5 km sprint event in Park City, Utah in the United States in 2002.

In April 2017, he announced his retirement from sport.

References

External links

 

1979 births
Living people
People from Kautokeino
Norwegian male Nordic combined skiers
Nordic combined skiers at the 2006 Winter Olympics
Nordic combined skiers at the 2014 Winter Olympics
Olympic Nordic combined skiers of Norway
FIS Nordic World Ski Championships medalists in Nordic combined
Olympic gold medalists for Norway
Medalists at the 2014 Winter Olympics
Olympic medalists in Nordic combined
Sportspeople from Troms og Finnmark
21st-century Norwegian people